An amalgamated hromada or amalgamated territorial community, also known as a united territorial community, was a special unit of administrative division in Ukraine from 2015 to 2020. First created in 2015, amalgamated hromadas were formed through the voluntary merger of preexisting hromadas, a form of third-level administrative unit including cities, villages, urban-type settlements, and rural settlements, to form a new enlarged administrative unit. On 6 March 2020 Prime Minister Denys Shmyhal stated that (at the time) 1,045 amalgamated hromadas had been established and that 350 more had to be created. As of 2020 the amalgamated hromadas already took over most tasks of the raions (education, healthcare, sport facilities, culture, and social welfare).

On 12 June 2020 the Cabinet of Ministers of Ukraine established the basic level of administrative division of Ukraine covering its whole territory except for Crimea. All previously established amalgamated hromadas, as well as preexisting hromadas, were subsumed by new units called simply hromadas or territorial communities.

History
Active formation of these communities started in 2015 and was part of the decentralization reform.

Ukrainian President Petro Poroshenko's June 2014 draft constitutional amendments proposed changing the administrative divisions of Ukraine, which should include oblasts, raions and hromadas.

On 5 February 2015 the Ukrainian parliament adopted the law "On voluntary association of territorial communities" that  creates amalgamated hromadas meaning settlement councils, rural councils and a city of district significance can create a new administrative unit. Any amalgamated hromada with a city as an administrative centre is an urban hromada, any amalgamated hromada with an urban-type settlement as an administrative centre is a settlement hromada, and any amalgamated hromada with a village as an administrative centre is a rural hromada. New local elections in these amalgamated hromadas were then held. 226 will be holding elections in 2018 and 2019. The first 252 were held in 2017.

The Law "On Local Self-Government in Ukraine" stipulates that local budgets should have enough money to be administered by local self-government bodies. Because many of the small rural councils and cities of district significance could never hope to do this, the new administrative unit amalgamated hromada was created. Amalgamated hromadas collect and spend more local taxes than the Raions of Ukraine were ever allowed to.

On 6 March 2020 Prime Minister Denys Shmyhal stated that 1,045 amalgamated hromadas had already been established in Ukraine, noting that 350 more had to be created.

On 12 June 2020 the Cabinet of Ministers of Ukraine established the basic level of administrative division of Ukraine covering its entire territory except for Crimea. All previously established amalgamated hromadas, as well as preexisting hromadas, were subsumed by new units called simply hromadas or territorial communities.

References

External links
 Decentralization in Ukraine. Informational portal about the decentralization reform
 Details. Ukrainian decentralization portal.

Subdivisions of Ukraine
Hromadas of Ukraine